He Zhiqiang (1934–2007) was a People's Republic of China politician. Born in Lijiang County, Yunnan Province. He was a member of the Nakhi people. A 1956 graduate of Chongqing University, he was governor of his home province from August 1985 to January 1998.

References

1934 births
2007 deaths
People's Republic of China politicians from Yunnan
Chinese Communist Party politicians from Yunnan
Governors of Yunnan
Delegates to the 7th National People's Congress
Delegates to the 8th National People's Congress
Chongqing University alumni
Nakhi people
Vice-governors of Yunnan
Alternate members of the 13th Central Committee of the Chinese Communist Party
Members of the 14th Central Committee of the Chinese Communist Party